Arroyomolinos de León is a town and municipality located in the province of Huelva, Spain. According to the 2010 census, the city has a population of 1,046 inhabitants (533 men and 513 women).

Demographics

Significant events
As a result of an explosion equivalent to 190 kilotonnes of TNT that occurred over the town on December 8, 1932. Arroyomolinos de León made it into the List of meteor air bursts. A meteoroid, connected to the δ-Arietids meteor shower, exploded 15.7 km (9.8 mi) overhead.
The authors of the conference paper making this claim provide no evidence that a meteor was seen by anyone outside the village.
And the authors also provide no evidence that this proposed massive explosion was seen or heard by anyone in any of the nearby villages.

References

External links
Arroyomolinos de León - Sistema de Información Multiterritorial de Andalucía

Municipalities in the Province of Huelva